The , is an electric multiple unit (EMU) commuter train type operated by the Kyoto Municipal Subway in Kyoto, Japan, since 1981.

Overview 
The 10 series was introduced in 1981 with nine four-car sets built to coincide with the opening of the Karasuma Line between Kyoto and Kitaoji stations. By 1997, the line was extended south to Takeda Station and north to Kokusaikaikan Station. These extensions were accompanied by an additional 84 cars spread over five batches.

Formations

Four-car sets 
Nine four car sets were introduced for the opening of the initial section on the Karasuma Line between Kyōto Station and Kitaōji Station in May 1981.

Six-car sets 
Starting from the third batch in 1988, all trains were lengthened to six-car trains. This was done to supplement the opening of an extension between Kyoto Station and Takeda Station.

Interior 

The interior consists of longitudinal seating throughout.

Disposal 
Set 1806 was scrapped in 2020. The remaining eight earlier-batch sets are set to undergo replacement as newer Kyoto Municipal Subway 20 series trains enter service.

References

External links 

 Official rolling stock website (in Japanese)

Kyoto Municipal Subway
Electric multiple units of Japan
Train-related introductions in 1981

Kinki Sharyo multiple units
1500 V DC multiple units of Japan